Aneesh Pilathottathil better known as Aneesh Gopal is an Indian actor and graphic designer known for his works primarily in malayalam films. He made his debut with Second Show in 2012.

Personal life
Aneesh Gopal was born in Cheekkode village, Malappuram, Kerala. Aneesh came to Malayalam cinema through film poster designing. Aneesh made his Malayalam film debut in 2012 with Srinath Rajendran's Second Show.

Filmography

As actor

References

External links 
 
 
 

Living people
Year of birth missing (living people)